William Sweetland Dallas   (1824–1890) was a British zoologist and curator. He curated collections at the British Museum and the Yorkshire Philosophical Society, and was editor of the Popular Science Review.

Biography
He was appointed Keeper of the Yorkshire Museum in 1858, at the age of 31 and already married with four children at the time.  Dallas was an editor and translator for the Zoological Record, the Annals and Magazine of Natural History and the Popular Science Review. In 1868 he was elected to the post of Assistant Secretary of the Geological Society, resulting in his resignation from the role of Keeper.

Notably, he translated Facts and Arguments for Darwin by German biologist Fritz Müller into English. He also translated Karl Theodor Ernst von Siebold's Wahre Parthenogenesis bei Schmetterlingen und Bienen (1856) into English as On a true parthenogenesis in moths and bees and created the index for Charles Darwin's The Variation of Animals and Plants Under Domestication.

Dallas was elected a member of the Linnean Society in 1849.

He died at Burlington House, Piccadilly on 29 May 1890 and was buried at West Norwood Cemetery.

Notes

References

 West Norwood Cemetery Dickens Connection, Friends of West Norwood Cemetery, 1995

External links
 
 Biography on Darwin Correspondence Project
 
 

1824 births
1890 deaths
19th-century British zoologists
Burials at West Norwood Cemetery
People associated with the British Museum
Yorkshire Museum people
Members of the Yorkshire Philosophical Society